The Utah Saints was a team of the American Indoor Football Association that played in 2008.  They played their home games at the Utah Olympic Oval in Kearns, Utah, a suburb of Salt Lake City.  The Oval is best known for being a venue of the 2002 Winter Olympics, known as the "Fastest Ice On Earth," and was expanded to 2,500 for Saints games.

The team was owned by Michael Curran, previously owner of the PIFL's Utah Catzz, and later on founder and CEO of the Utah Indoor Football League.

The team name is a reference to the Church of Jesus Christ of Latter-day Saints (Mormons), which is the preferred religion of 58% of Utah's adult population.

Season-by-season 

|-
|2008 || 1 || 13 || 0 || 4th WC West || --

References

External links 
Official Website (under construction)
Saints' 2008 Stats
League Press Release

American Indoor Football Association teams
Salt Lake County, Utah
Sports in Salt Lake City
American football teams in Utah
American football teams established in 2008
American football teams disestablished in 2008
2008 establishments in Utah
2008 disestablishments in Utah